The Victoria Hotel is a major hotel in Amsterdam, Netherlands. It is on the corner of the Damrak and Prins Hendrikkade, close to Amsterdam Centraal station. The Victoria Hotel is one of the oldest hotels in The Netherlands.

The hotel opened on 19 August 1890 and was designed by J.F. Henkenhaf. It was the first hotel in the country to have electric lighting. During the years it has attracted well-known clientele, including Billy Graham, Louis Armstrong, Zarah Leander, Fats Domino, Glenda Jackson and more recently Katy Perry, Anastacia, Marilyn Manson and Iron Maiden.

The building is designed around two older properties, Nos. 45 - 47 Prins Hendrikkade, that the hotel was unable to purchase owing to high prices. This idiosyncrasy was explored in the book and subsequent film Publieke werken (Public Works). The film is also known as A Noble Intention (2015).

On 13 July 2001, the Rijksdienst voor het Cultureel Erfgoed selected the Victoria hotel as a National heritage site.

References

External links 
Park Plaza Victoria Hotel Amsterdam

Hotels in Amsterdam
PPHE Hotel Group hotels
Park Plaza Hotels & Resorts
Hotels established in 1890
Hotel buildings completed in 1890